"Neko ni Fūsen" (ネコに風船; A Cat with a Balloon) is Ai Otsuka's 9th single, which was released on 13 July 2005. This single sold 111,324 units and reached #92 on the 2005 Oricon yearly charts.

Track list

References
avex network inc. (2006), Ai Otsuka Official Web Site

2005 songs
Ai Otsuka songs
Song recordings produced by Max Matsuura
2005 singles
Songs written by Ai Otsuka
Avex Trax singles
Japanese film songs